The Men's 800m athletics events for the 2016 Summer Paralympics took place at the Estádio Olímpico João Havelange from September 8 to September 16, 2016. One event was contested over this distance for 19 different classifications.

Schedule

Medal summary

Results

The following were the results of the finals of each of the Men's 5000 metres events in each of the classifications. Further details of each event are available on that event's dedicated page.

T11

The Men's 5000 metres T11 event at the 2016 Summer Paralympics took place at the Rio Olympic Stadium on 8 September.
 
The event was undertaken as a single final for all competitors, using guides. It was the first medal awarded at the 2016 Summer Paralympics, and was won by Kenya's Samwel Mushai Kimani, holding off the host's world champion Odair Santos, who took silver ahead of Kenyan Wilson Bii.

T13

10:00 15 September 2016:

T54

10:15 11 September 2016:

Q = qualified by place. q = qualified by time. DQ = disqualified RR = Regional Record. PB = Personal Best. SB = Seasonal Best. DNF = Did not finish. DNS = Did not start.

References

Athletics at the 2016 Summer Paralympics
2016 in men's athletics